Ramy Sabry (born 5 January 1987), is an Egyptian footballer who plays for Egyptian Premier League side pharco as a center-back. A one-club man, Sabry played for ENPPI during his entire career‚Now Sabry playing for Pharco FC .

References

External links
 
 

1987 births
Living people
Egyptian footballers
Association football defenders
Egyptian Premier League players
ENPPI SC players